Nikita Gill is a British-Indian poet, playwright, writer and illustrator based in the south England. She has written and curated seven volumes of poetry. She uses social media to engage her audience and she has over 650,000 followers on Instagram, one of the most popular poets on the platform.

Life 
Gill was born in Belfast to Indian parents who had been living in Ireland. She has Irish citizenship and Overseas Citizenship of India. Her father was in the merchant navy. The family moved to New Delhi when Gill was six, and she grew up and was educated there. Gill studied Design at university in New Delhi, and she completed a master's degree at the University for the Creative Arts. She worked as a cleaner and a carer after her education.

Work 
Gill's work was first published when she was 12 years old. Gill has published eight volumes of poetry, including Your Soul Is A River (2016), Wild Embers: Poems of rebellion, fire and beauty (2017), Fierce Fairytales: & Other Stories to Stir Your Soul (2018), Great Goddesses: Life lessons from myths and monsters (2019), Your Heart Is The Sea (2019), The Girl and the Goddess (2020), Where Hope Comes From: Poems of Resilience, Healing, and Light (2021), and These Are the Words: fearless verse to find your voice (2022). Her work offers reflections on love, and feminist re-tellings of fairy tales and Greek myths. She has been inspired by the works of Sylvia Plath, Maya Angelou and Robert Frost.

She wrote and performed her debut work for the stage, Maidens, Myths, and Monsters. She is an ambassador for National Poetry Day. Gill has appeared on the BBC, contributing to Woman's Hour on Radio Four, Free Thinking on Radio Three, and BBC Asian Network.

See also 
 Instapoetry

References

External links 

TedX Profile: http://tedxlondon.com/attend/TEDxLondonWomen2019/speakers/NikitaGill

Alumni of the University for the Creative Arts
21st-century poets from Northern Ireland
21st-century women writers from Northern Ireland
British writers of Indian descent
Instagram poets
Living people
Year of birth missing (living people)